The 1998 Indy 200 at Walt Disney World was the first round of the 1998 Indy Racing League season. The race was held on January 24, 1998 at the  Walt Disney World Speedway in Bay Lake, Florida. As in 1997, rain hampered the event, this time forcing to cancel the qualifying session.

Report

Qualifying

For the first time in IRL history, torrential rain forced the qualifying session to be cancelled. Thus, the grid was set by 1996-1997 entrant points. The remaining new entries were sorted by practice speeds. The grid was limited to 28 cars due to concerns about safety in the pit area.

  Changed to a backup car for the race, following a crash in a practice session after qualifying.

Failed to qualify or withdrew
 John Hollansworth Jr. R for Blueprint Racing - couldn't pass his rookie test in time for the race and did not take part in official practice. Replaced by  Robbie Groff.

Race
Tony Stewart outlasted all challengers to take his second IRL victory. Starting on the pole, he was quickly passed by Roberto Guerrero who pulled away until he got collected in an accident in turn 1. Stewart then led the rest of the first half of the race, which was marked by numerous incidents taking out contenders: Scott Sharp got tangled up with a slower car and had to pit for a new nose, Scott Goodyear slid into the wall in the midstretch and suffered suspension damage, Raul Boesel collided in the pit lane with Robbie Buhl and needed a radiator replaced, and defending champion Eddie Cheever dropped out with engine failure. 

Unexpected cold weather caused tire problems for the competitors; Robbie Groff wrecked at the start of the race when his rear tires broke loose under acceleration, and Billy Boat had a grinding crash on the inside wall of the front stretch when the same thing happened to him on a restart. On lap 132, Buddy Lazier took the lead and held it until he got bound up behind a slower car, spun, and hit the back stretch inside wall on lap 166. At that point, all five cars remaining in the lead lap (Stewart, Davey Hamilton, Jeff Ward, Stéphan Grégoire and Mark Dismore) were marginal on fuel mileage. Stewart, Hamilton, and Ward pitted for fuel, while Dismore and Grégoire elected to gamble and assumed the top two places. 

After the restart, Dismore held off Stewart (who had moved back up to second) while Grégoire, Hamilton, and Ward all dueled for third. The gamble didn't work for Dismore, and he finally had to pit for fuel on lap 197 after Stewart had passed him two laps earlier when the engine stumbled. On the final lap, Ward passed Hamilton, and then claimed second place as Grégoire ran out of fuel and coasted across the line to a fourth-place finish.

Race Statistics
Lead changes: 8 among 5 drivers

Standings after the race

Drivers' Championship standings

 Note: Only the top five positions are included for the standings.

References

External links
IndyCar official website

1998 in IndyCar
Indy 200 At Walt Disney World
Walt Disney World
Events at Walt Disney World